Ibrahima Sory Camara (born January 1, 1985 in Freetown, Sierra Leone) is a naturalized Guinean international football midfielder.

Biography
Camara grew up in Freetown and moved to Guinea during the Sierra Leone civil war.

Club career

In 04/05 season, he was promoted to Parma F.C.'s first team, made 9 Serie A appearances and 7 UEFA Cup appearances, which Parma finished as losing Semi-finalists to champion CSKA Moscow.

In summer 2006, he was loaned to Le Mans Union Club 72, and turned to permanent move in summer 2007. On 1 February 2010 Le Mans 25-year-old defender played on loan for FC Nantes until the end of the season. In July 2010 he accepted an offer from Celtic F.C. to go on trial for a week, but failed to impress the Scottish club. Instead, he joined the Belgian side K.A.S. Eupen.

By early 2015, he joined Serbian second level side FK Zemun. Ibrahima Sory Camara made five appearances in the 2015–16 Serbian First League.

International career
He was a member of the Guinea national team from 2005 to 2011, earning 40 caps.

Camara was the member of national team that finished top of the group stage, and lost in the quarter finals to Senegal in 2006 African Cup of Nations.

Honours
Kaloum Star
Guinée Championnat National: 2013–14

References

1985 births
Living people
Sportspeople from Freetown
Guinean footballers
Guinea international footballers
Sierra Leonean footballers
Sierra Leonean emigrants to Guinea
2006 Africa Cup of Nations players
2008 Africa Cup of Nations players
Association football fullbacks
Expatriate footballers in France
Expatriate footballers in Italy
FC Nantes players
Guinean expatriate footballers
Le Mans FC players
Ligue 1 players
Naturalized citizens of Guinea
Parma Calcio 1913 players
Serie A players
FK Zemun players
Serbian First League players
Expatriate footballers in Serbia
COD Meknès players
Botola players
Expatriate footballers in Morocco
Chinland F.C. players
Expatriate footballers in Myanmar